Saddle Serenade is a 1945 American Western film directed by Oliver Drake and written by Frances Kavanaugh. The film stars Jimmy Wakely, Lee "Lasses" White, John James, Nancy Brinckman, Jack Ingram and Claire James. The film was released on August 11, 1945, by Monogram Pictures.

Plot

Cast          
Jimmy Wakely as Jimmy Wakely
Lee "Lasses" White as Lasses
John James as Dusty Smith
Nancy Brinckman as Doris Rogers
Jack Ingram as Roy Williams
Claire James as Brenda Ames
Pat Gleason as Vaughn
Kay Deslys as Fanny Vandercoop
Roy Butler as Sheriff Hawkins
Foy Willing as Guitar Player

References

External links
 

1945 films
American Western (genre) films
1945 Western (genre) films
Monogram Pictures films
Films directed by Oliver Drake
American black-and-white films
1940s English-language films
1940s American films